Stuttgart Airport (German: Flughafen Stuttgart, formerly Flughafen Stuttgart-Echterdingen)  is the international airport of Stuttgart, the capital of the German state of Baden-Württemberg. It is christened in honor of Stuttgart's former mayor, Manfred Rommel, son of Erwin Rommel, and is the sixth busiest airport in Germany with 11,832,634 passengers having passed through its doors in 2018.

The airport is operated by Flughafen Stuttgart GmbH (FSG). It goes back to Luftverkehr Württemberg AG, which was founded in 1924 and initially operated Böblingen Airport. Since 2008, 65% of the operating company is owned by the state of Baden-Württemberg and 35% by the city of Stuttgart. In 2007, the Stuttgart Trade Fair – the ninth biggest exhibition centre in Germany – moved to grounds directly next to the airport. Additionally, the global headquarters for car parking company APCOA Parking are located here.

History

First years and World War II
The airport was built in 1939 to replace Böblingen Airport. In 1945, the United States Army took over the airport until returning it to German authorities in 1948.

For the duration of the Cold War the runway and facilities were shared with the United States Army who operated helicopters, the Grumman OV-1 Mohawk and other fixed wing aircraft as Echterdingen Army Airfield on the southern portion of the airfield.  Some of the units operating at Echterdingen were headquartered at nearby Nellingen Kaserne- now closed and redeveloped. In 1984–5, the 223rd Aviation Battalion (Combat) of the 11th Aviation Group (Combat) was headquartered at Echterdingen, with three aviation companies assigned (one at Schwäbisch Hall). The U.S. Army still maintains a small helicopter base - Stuttgart Army Airfield - on the southern side of the airport, which it shares with the Baden-Württemberg State Police helicopter wing. The police helicopter wing falls under the control of Stuttgart Police Department and has six modern helicopters based at Stuttgart and two in Söllingen.

Later development
The airport was expanded after World War II. Renovation was scheduled for 2020, full closure phase was preponed to be completed in April during the corona lockdown.

The original 1938 terminal was finally replaced in 2004 and there are now four terminals with a maximum capacity of approximately 12 million passengers.

Politicians, town planners and nearby residents have been arguing for years about the construction of a second runway. However, on 25 June 2008 Minister-President Günther Oettinger announced that for the next 8–12 years no second runway will be built and that the restrictions for night operations stay in place.

After the death of former mayor Manfred Rommel in November 2013 local politicians proposed renaming the airport after him. This proposal caused public disputes as he was the son of Erwin Rommel but also highly respected for his work on intercultural affairs. In July 2014 it has been announced that the airport will be named Flughafen Stuttgart - Manfred Rommel Flughafen from now on. In September 2016, the airport unveiled new branding and corporate design, changing its official name from Flughafen Stuttgart to Stuttgart Airport.

In September 2014, United Airlines cancelled their route to Stuttgart from Newark due to insufficient demand leaving Stuttgart Airport with only one remaining long-haul connection to Atlanta provided by Delta Air Lines.

In October 2014, easyJet announced they would serve Stuttgart as their seventh German destination by March 2015. In December 2014, Ryanair also added Stuttgart as a destination in their network with six weekly flights to Manchester from April 2015.

Air Berlin announced the start of a service to Abu Dhabi from December 2014. On 31 May 2016, Air Berlin ceased its flights to Abu Dhabi. In October 2016, Air Berlin announced it would close its maintenance facilities at the airport due to cost cutting and restructuring measures.

In July 2020, Lauda announced the closure of their base at Stuttgart Airport — which has been operated as a wetlease for Ryanair — by October 2020. Prior to this announcement, the base staff rejected a new labour agreement. In October 2021, Delta Air Lines terminated their service to Atlanta after being suspended since 2020 and nearly 35 years of service, leaving the airport without any scheduled long-haul operations. However this route is planned to resume in March 2023 after a three-year hiatus.

Terminals
Stuttgart Airport consists of four passenger terminals which have separate check-in facilities and entrances but are directly connected to each other and share a single airside area which features eight Jet bridges as well as about two dozen bus-boarding stands.

 Terminal 1 is the first of two landside main halls and features together with its addition Terminal 1-West 50 check-in counters. It shares the roof with Terminals 2 and 3 and is mainly used by Eurowings and Turkish Airlines.
 Terminal 2 is a small area featuring nine check-in counters and a security checkpoint. It is located within the shopping area between the main halls of Terminals 1 and 3. It is used by Lufthansa & Star Alliance partners in addition to their counters in Terminal 1.
 Terminal 3 is the second of the two landside main halls east of Terminal 1 and 2 and features 39 additional check-in counters. It is used by TUIfly and KLM among several other airlines.
 Terminal 4 is, unlike the other three terminals, a separate and very basic equipped building to the east of Terminals 1 to 3 but also connected to them by a walk way. It features 17 more check-in counters as well as several bus-boarding gates and is used mostly for holiday charter operations. In March 2018, the airport administration announced that Terminal 4 will be entirely rebuilt and expanded in the coming years.

Airlines and destinations

Passenger
The following airlines offer regular scheduled and charter flights at Stuttgart Airport:

Cargo

Statistics

Passengers and movements

Largest airlines

Busiest routes

Ground transportation

Car

There are two major highways: Just north of the airport runs the Bundesautobahn 8 (A8), which connects the cities of Karlsruhe and Stuttgart to Ulm, Augsburg and Munich. The Bundesstraße 27 (B27) leads to downtown Stuttgart, as well as to Tübingen and Reutlingen in the South.

Coach
From the regional cities of Esslingen am Neckar, Reutlingen, Tübingen and Kirchheim exists a connection by coach. Additionally, German long-distance coach operators DeinBus and Flixbus maintain their stop for Stuttgart on the airport grounds with direct connections to several major cities.

Suburban railway
Stuttgart Airport can be easily reached within 30 minutes from the city's main railway station using the Stuttgart suburban railway S2 or S3 from Stuttgart Flughafen/Messe station.

Future long-distance railway
It is planned to connect the airport with the future Stuttgart - Ulm high-speed railway line currently under construction as part of the major Stuttgart 21 railway redevelopment program. Therefore, a new long-distance train station will be built on the airport's grounds near the existing suburban railway station. The new station, which will be served by ICE high-speed trains will be connected to the new line by an underground loop track. The Stuttgart-Ulm line is scheduled to be opened in 2020 while the new airport connection is planned to be inaugurated in 2022.

Accidents and incidents
 On 19 January 2010, Bin Air Swearingen SA-227-C Metro D-CKPP was damaged when the right main undercarriage collapsed on landing.

See also
 Transport in Germany
 List of airports in Germany

References

External links

 Official website
 
 
 Historical U.S. Army information

Buildings and structures in Stuttgart
Transport in Stuttgart
Gerkan, Marg and Partners buildings
Airports in Baden-Württemberg